Project for a metropole is an architecture plan by Étienne-Louis Boullée designed around 1781. It deals with light, as do many of his designs, as an important element. Light is a metaphor for enlightenment as is darkness for ignorance. The plan features columns spaced closer together then the canon for classical architecture would have them be placed and oversized pendentives.

1780s architecture
Neoclassical architecture in France
Proposed buildings and structures in France